Moinul Hassan is a politician from All India Trinamool Congress and was a member of CPIM State Committee. He was a Member of the Parliament of India representing West Bengal in the Rajya Sabha, the upper house of the Indian Parliament.

Political career

On 2 September 2015, while leading a political rally of CPI (M) at Berhampur, he was physically attacked by the police and local Trinamool Congress goons for opposing the Trinamool government.

During 2016 Assembly Polls he strongly advocated for an unified movement with secular anti-mamata forces in West Bengal.
He joined All India Trinamool Congress on 21 July 2018.

Books published

In Bengali: 
Muslim Samaj and Present Times (two parts), 2003 
Muslim Samaj: Kayekti Prasangik Alochona, 2003 
Pakisthan: Pratibeshir Andermahal, 2004 
 Muslim Samaje Sangsker Andolan, 2005 
Indology: Past, Present and future, 2005 
China: Ekti Antarborty Pratibedan Edited
Islam and Contemporary World, 2009
Marx theke Gramsci, 2015
Jukti, Torko, Bitarka, 2016
Moulabad Sampradayikota Itihas Rachona Eboing Ei Samay (Foreword by Prof Irfan Habib), 2016
Bangali Musolman Jibon O Sangoskriti, 2015
Priyojoneshu, 2017
Dharmo O Marxbad, 2018

References

External links
 Profile on Rajya Sabha website

India MPs 1998–1999
India MPs 1999–2004
Communist Party of India (Marxist) politicians from West Bengal
Living people
Rajya Sabha members from West Bengal
Lok Sabha members from West Bengal
1958 births
People from Murshidabad district
Trinamool Congress politicians from West Bengal
Krishnath College alumni